Finding Nemo is a CGI animated film series and Disney media franchise that began with the 2003 film of the same name, produced by Pixar and released by Walt Disney Pictures. The original film was followed by a sequel, Finding Dory, released in 2016. Both films were directed by Andrew Stanton. The film series received widespread critical acclaim from critics and audiences with two films released to-date, the series has grossed $1.9 billion worldwide.

Film series

Finding Nemo (2003)

Finding Nemo is the fifth Pixar film. The film tells the story of a clownfish named Nemo (voiced by Alexander Gould) who gets abducted from his home in the Great Barrier Reef and winds up in a dentist’s office aquarium. His over-protective father Marlin (voiced by Albert Brooks) who, along with an amnesiac regal tang named Dory (voiced by Ellen DeGeneres), searches for him all the way to Sydney Harbour. Along the way, Marlin learns to take risks and let little Nemo take care of himself.

Finding Dory (2016)

Finding Dory is the seventeenth Pixar film. The film focuses on the amnesiac character Dory, (voiced by Ellen DeGeneres) who travels to California to find her long-lost parents, Jenny and Charlie, as well as exploring the idea of her being reunited with her family. It takes place one year after Finding Nemo and is set off the coast of Morro Bay, California.

Future films
Director Andrew Stanton commented in June 2016 about the possibility of a third Finding Nemo film, stating:

Short films

Exploring the Reef with Jean-Michel Cousteau (2003)

Exploring the Reef is a short documentary film. It features Jean-Michel Cousteau, exploring the Great Barrier Reef, but Marlin, Dory, and Nemo keep interrupting him. The short film is included on the Finding Nemo DVD.

Marine Life Interviews (2016)
Marine Life Interviews focuses on some of the supporting characters within Dory as they give brief interviews and thoughts on Dory herself. This is similar to the character interviews for Finding Nemo.

Dory Finding (2021)
Dory Finding shows Dory finding items from the surface in the coral reef. This short is part of the Pixar Popcorn series on Disney+.

Reception

Box office performance
Finding Nemo is the second highest-grossing film of 2003, behind The Lord of the Rings: The Return of the King. It was the highest-grossing Pixar film, up until 2010 when Toy Story 3 surpassed it. Finding Dory is the third-highest-grossing film of 2016, behind Civil War and Rogue One. 

Finding Nemo is the 6th highest-grossing animated franchise and holds the third average box office gross per film among all animated franchises in box office history ($983.8million) .

Critical and public response

Accolades

Both films received universal acclaim, with the first film winning the Academy Award for Best Animated Feature. It was a financial blockbuster as it grossed over $921 million worldwide. It is the best-selling DVD of all time, with over 40 million copies sold as of 2006 and is the 2nd highest grossing G-rated movie of all time. In 2008, the American Film Institute named it the 10th greatest American Animated film ever made during their 10 Top 10. It also won the award for best Animated Film at the Kansas City Film Critics Circle Awards, the Las Vegas Film Critics Society Awards, the National Board of Review Awards, the Online Film Critics Society Awards, and the Toronto Film Critics Association Awards.

Cast and characters

 Note: A grey cell indicates that the character didn't appear in the film.

Theme park attractions 
 Crush's Coaster at Walt Disney Studios Park at Disneyland Paris.
 Finding Nemo Submarine Voyage at Disneyland at Disneyland Resort.
 Finding Nemo – The Musical at Disney's Animal Kingdom at Walt Disney World.
 The Seas with Nemo & Friends at Epcot at Walt Disney World.
 Turtle Talk with Crush at Epcot at Walt Disney World, Disney California Adventure at Disneyland Resort and Tokyo DisneySea at Tokyo Disney Resort.
 Nemo & Friends SeaRider at Tokyo DisneySea at Tokyo Disney Resort.

Other media

Video games

Finding Nemo

Finding Nemo was released in 2003 by THQ. The goal in the game is to complete different levels under the roles of film protagonists Nemo, Marlin or Dory. It includes cutscenes from the movie and each clip is based on a level. For example, Marlin and Dory hopping through a batch of jellyfish.

The game received mixed reviews. It received 2/5 stars on GameSpy, 6.2/10 points on GameSpot and IGN gave it 7.0/10 and 6.0/10 on its PS2 and Xbox, and GameCube platforms, respectively.

Disney Friends

In 2007, Disney Interactive Studios released Disney Friends. It is a video game based on various Disney films. The game features characters Stitch from Lilo & Stitch, Dory from Finding Nemo, Pooh from Winnie the Pooh, and Simba from The Lion King.

Kinect: Disneyland Adventures

Kinect: Disneyland Adventures is a video game released in 2011 by Frontier Developments. The game is based in various Disneyland attractions. It was released on Kinect for Xbox 360. Characters from Finding Nemo appear as part of a minigame based on Finding Nemo Submarine Voyage.

Nemo's Reef
Nemo's Reef was a mobile game available from December 20, 2012 to June 30, 2017 by Disney Mobile. The game is a casual reef building which features characters from Finding Nemo. It was released on Android and iOS devices.

Disney Infinity

Disney Infinity was a video game series developed by Avalanche Software that ran from 2013 to 2016. Elements from Finding Nemo appeared throughout all three games in the series, with power discs based on the film released for the first game, and a playset based on Finding Dory along with Dory and Nemo figures released for the console versions of Disney Infinity 3.0 in June 2016. The aforementioned playset and figures were the last new content released for the series, which was cancelled by Disney in May 2016.

Rush: A Disney•Pixar Adventure

Kinect Rush: A Disney•Pixar Adventure is a video game developed by Asobo Studio originally released in 2012 for Xbox 360. On October 31, 2017, a remastered release without the Kinect branding titled Rush: A Disney•Pixar Adventure was released for Xbox One and Microsoft Windows 10. The remastered version adds a world based on Finding Dory alongside the original release's worlds.

Disney Magic Kingdoms

During a limited time Event focused on the franchise, under the name "Finding Marlin", the world builder game Disney Magic Kingdoms included Nemo, Marlin, Dory, Crush, Squirt, Bruce and Hank as playable characters, along with the attractions Crush's Coaster, Finding Nemo Submarine Voyage, and The Seas with Nemo and Friends. Bailey and Destiny were also included as playable characters in a later update of the game. In the game the characters are involved in new storylines that serve as a continuation of the events in the films.

Stage musical

Finding Nemo – The Musical is a 40-minute show (performed five times daily), which opened on January 24, 2007 at the Theater in the Wild at Disney's Animal Kingdom in Orlando, Florida. It is a musical adaption of the film with new songs written by Tony Award-winning Avenue Q composer Robert Lopez and his wife, Kristen Anderson-Lopez. It would "combine puppets, dancers, acrobats and animated backdrops".

Appearance on Fetch! With Ruff Ruffman

IN the PBS KIDS Show Fetch! With Ruff Ruffman, Crush the sea turtle appeared as a guest star in the Season 5 episode, "The Ol' Shell Game", voiced again by Andrew Stanton.

Magazine
In August 2016, Egmont Publishing launched a magazine, titled Finding Dory.

Music

Finding Nemo is the soundtrack album of the film of the same name. Finding Dory is the soundtrack album of the film of the same name. The soundtracks were scored by Thomas Newman.

The score was nominated for the 76th Academy Awards for Best Original Score but lost against The Lord of the Rings: The Return of the King. It received 5/5 stars from the Film Score Reviews and 3.5/5 stars from Soundtrack.net.

Crew

References

Finding Nemo
Pixar franchises
Film series introduced in 2003
Animated film series
Recurring events established in 2003
Computer-animated films
Children's film series